The Austrian Association of Women Artists (German: Vereinigung bildender Künstlerinnen Österreichs; VBKÖ) was founded in 1910. The VBKÖ is located at Maysedergasse 2/4, Vienna 1010, its founding headquarters.  The association supports improvements to the economic and educational conditions of female artists, as well as promoting the artists themselves.

Historical Beginnings

Founded in 1910, VBKÖ's first president was Baronin Olga Brand-Krieghammer who oversaw the association's first six years. Broadly, the mission of VBKÖ was to make more female artists visible, though in order to achieve this, other economic, educational and health concerns required betterment as well. A program of exhibitions began from VBKÖ's inception, and these shows laid the foundations for future feminist discourse.

Käthe Kollwitz, Tina Blau, Marie Egner, Helene Funke and Olga Wisinger-Florian were all connected to the VBKÖ, some as active members, while others were invited to exhibit. VBKÖ rented its own studio and exhibition space, allowing artists to work outside of the established art world. The VBKÖ is one of many Euro-American organizations that support women artists and other examples include the Society of Female Artists London, founded in 1855; the Vereinigung der Berliner Künstlerinnen und Kunstfreunde, Berlin founded in 1867; the Société de l’Union des Femmes Peintres et Sculpteurs (Society of the Union of Women Painters and Sculptors), Paris, founded in 1881; and the National Association of Women Artists, United States, founded in 1889.

take! make! activate! VBKÖ-Archiv 

The take! make! activate! VBKÖ-Archiv contains significant material, files, and collections from 1910 to 2005. The archive, developed by the women artists, has grown since its creation. The inventory list of the archive (compiled by Sabine Harik, PhD) was released in 2006, expanded by the Findbuch zur Vereinigung bildender Künstlerinnen Österreichs (Ed.: VBKÖ, Rudolfine Lackner) as well as the DOWNLOAD, for the purpose of independent preparatory research. The archive is accessible by appointment.

References

Further reading 
Julie Marie Johnson: The Memory Factory: The Forgotten Women Artists of Vienna 1900, Purdue University Press, 2012, 
Marie-Sophie Brendinger: Die Vereinigung bildender Künstlerinnen Österreichs. Studien zu ihrer Rolle in Kunst- und Frauengeschichte Europas, Dipl. Arbeit, Wien 2011
Rudolfine Lackner (Hg.in/Ed.): 100 Jahre/Years VBKÖ Festschrift, VBKÖ: Wien, 2011, 978-3-200-02201-0
Megan Marie Brandow-Faller: An Art Of Their Own: Reinventing Frauenkunst In The Female Academies And Artist Leagues Of Late-Imperial And First Republic Austria, 1900–1930, PhD diss., Georgetown University, Washington D.C. 2010 https://web.archive.org/web/20161101175218/https://repository.library.georgetown.edu/bitstream/handle/10822/553120/brandowMegan.pdf?sequence=1
Rudolfine Lackner: Institutional Activisms. In: n.paradoxa. International Feminist Art Journal. Ed. Katy Deepwell, 48–55, Vol. 23 on Activist Art, 2009, ISSN 1461-0434
Rudolfine Lackner (Hrsg.in): Names Are Shaping Up Nicely! Gendered Nomenclature in Art, Language, Law, and Philosophy, VBKÖ, Wien 2008,  
Rudolfine Lackner, VBKÖ (Hg.innen): Das Findbuch zur Vereinigung bildender Künstlerinnen Österreichs, VBKÖ, Wien 2006, 
Julie Marie Johnson: "The Art Of The Woman: Women's Art Exhibitions in Fin-de-siecle Vienna." Ph.D. diss., University of Chicago, 1998.
Julie Marie Johnson: Schminke und Frauenkunst. Konstruktionen weiblicher Ästhetik um die Ausstellung „Die Kunst der Frau“, 1910, In: Lisa Fischer, Emil Brix (Hrsg.): Die Frauen der Wiener Moderne, R. Oldenbourg Verlag, München 1997, S. 167–178,  
Julie Marie Johnson: From Brocades to Silks and Powders. Women’s Art Exhibitions and the Formation of a Gendered Aesthetic in Fin-de-siècle Vienna, In: Austrian history yearbook, Band 28, Minneapolis 1997, S. 269 – 292 
Sabine Plakolm-Forsthuber: Künstlerinnen in Österreich 1897–1938. Malerei, Plastik, Architektur, Wien 1994,

External links
 Vereinigung bildender Künstlerinnen Österreichs (official website)
 Exhibition catalogues and annual reports of the Vereinigung in the Belvedere Digital Library
 VBKÖ Bestandsverzeichnis

Cultural organisations based in Austria
Arts organizations established in 1910
Austrian artists
 
1910 establishments in Austria